A moon clip is a ring-shaped or star-shaped piece of metal designed to hold multiple cartridges together as a unit, for simultaneous insertion and extraction from a revolver cylinder. Moon clips may either hold an entire cylinder's worth of cartridges together (full moon clip), half a cylinder (half moon clip), or just two neighboring cartridges.  The two-cartridge moon clips can be used for those revolvers that have an odd number of loading chambers such as five or seven and also for those revolvers that allow a shooter to mix both rimless and rimmed types of cartridges in one loading of the same cylinder (e.g., 2 adjacent rounds of .45 ACP, 2 rounds of .45 Colt, and 2 rounds of .410 in a single six-chamber S&W Governor cylinder).

Moon clips can be used either to chamber rimless cartridges in a double-action revolver (which would normally require rimmed cartridges), or to chamber multiple rimmed cartridges simultaneously. Moon clips are generally made from spring grade steel, although plastic versions have also been produced. Unlike a speedloader, a moon clip remains in place during firing, and after firing, is used to extract the empty cartridge cases.

History

The modern moon clip was devised shortly before World War I in 1908.  The device then became widespread during the war, when the relatively new M1911 semi-automatic pistol could not be manufactured fast enough for the war effort.  The U.S. War Department asked Smith & Wesson and Colt to devise ways to use the M1911's .45 ACP rimless cartridge in their revolvers.  The result was the M1917 revolver, employing moon clips to chamber the military-issue .45 ACP ammunition. Smith & Wesson invented and patented the half-moon clip, but at the request of the Army allowed Colt to also use the design free of charge in their own version of the M1917 revolver. After the War, Naomi Alan, an engineer employed by Smith & Wesson, developed a 6-round full-moon clip.

However, many civilian shooters disliked and still dislike using moon clips. Although full moon clips allow a revolver to be very quickly reloaded, loading and unloading the clips is tedious, and bent clips can bind the cylinder and cause misfires.

Moon Clips can be formed by stamped high carbon steel, heat treated and finished to prevent rust.  Alternatively they can be made from pre-heat treated stainless steel and cut out using either wire EDM or Laser machinery.  They can also be made by injection molding plastic.  Each process has its benefits and drawbacks such as cost and durability.

Speed
Moon clips can even be faster to use than a speedloader with the proper training. This feat was possible by using moon clips to allow quick and reliable ejection of the fired rounds, and a quick reload of all six chambers at once.

Use
Moon clips have been made available for 19 different calibers;  .30 Carbine, .327Fed, .380ACP, 9mm, .38 Super, .38S&W, .38Spc, .357Mag, .40S&W, 10mm, .41Mag, .44 Spc, .44Mag, .45LC, .454Casull, .45ACP, .45 Super, .460S&W and .460 Rowland.

Common revolver models that are manufactured to use moon clips:

 9×17 mm and 9×18mm Makarov
 OTs-01 Kobalt
 R-92
9mm Luger
Charter Arms Pitbull
S&W Model 940
S&W Model 929 
S&W Model 986
Ruger LCR
Ruger SP101
Ruger Speed-Six
Taurus Model 905
Alfa Proj. 9200 series
10mm Auto/.40 S&W
S&W Model 610
.40 S&W
S&W Model 646
.45 ACP
M1917 revolver
Ruger Redhawk,,,
S&W Model 22
S&W Models 25 (for blue) and 625 (for stainless)
S&W Governor
Webley revolver  ( Beginning with the Mark VI, which was British Army standard issue from 1915.  Moonclips can also be used to enable .455 Webleys to shoot the .45 ACP cartridge — a common, though dangerous adaptation, as the .45 ACP standard pressure is above maximum pressure ratings for all models of Webley revolver.)
7.62×41.5mm SP-4
OTs-38 Stechkin

References

Firearm components